Oritocatopini is a tribe of small carrion beetles in the family Leiodidae.

Genera
These three genera belong to the tribe Oritocatopini:
 Afrocatops
 Chappuisiotes
 Oritocatops

References

Further reading

 
 
 

Leiodidae